Eric Maria Gerets (born 18 May 1954) is a Belgian football manager and former player who played as a right back. 

He started his playing career as an amateur for his local team AA Rekem, before achieving success with Standard Liège and PSV. Nicknamed "The Lion (of Flanders)", Gerets was regarded as one of the top right backs in Europe at his peak and is considered one of the greatest players in Belgian football history. He is famous for having captained PSV to their first and only European Cup win in 1988.

As a coach, Gerets is best known for his advocacy of systems thinking. He is one of six managers – along with José Mourinho, Carlo Ancelotti, Giovanni Trapattoni, Tomislav Ivić and Ernst Happel – to have won top domestic league championships in at least four European countries.

Club career
Gerets began his career playing for amateur side AA Rekem before joining then titleholders Standard de Liège. Making his debut 16 April 1972 coming on for Silvester Takač against FC Diest. In the 1972–73 season Standard reached the Cup final, manager Vlatko Marković let Gerets start despite not being an established first team member as Standard lost 2–1 to fierce rivals Anderlecht. The following season, Gerets replaced 29-year-old Jacques Beurlet and became the first choice right back for the Rouches. In 1975 Gerets made his debut for the national team.

Gerets played for Standard Liège, Milan, MVV Maastricht and PSV, winning among others the 1987–88 European Cup, two Belgian championships and six Dutch championships.

Gerets was an offensively-minded right back, known for his stamina, tactical discipline, grit and mental toughness. He was also known for long distance throw-ins.

He is the third-most capped player for the Belgium national team, with 86 appearances and two goals.

Standard Liège
In the 1980s, a new generation of players emerged at Standard. Noted manager Ernst Happel was hired, and later the club brought Raymond Goethals back to Belgium. Players like Arie Haan, Guy Vandersmissen, Michel Preud'homme, Walter Meeuws, Jos Daerden and Simon Tahamata became key players, whilst Gerets was the captain of the team. In 1980, Standard finished runners-up in the league, before winning the 1981 National Cup with a 4–1 win over Lokeren SC. In 1982, Standard won the title by beating Waterschei SV Thor in the last match of the season. A few days later, they faced Barcelona in the European Cup Winners' Cup final, which they lost 2–1. The influence of Gerets on Standard's success was recognised when he was awarded the 1982 Belgian Golden Shoe. The following year he captained Standard to another league title, their ninth overall, which would prove to be their last until 2007–08.

PSV

In 1985, Gerets joined PSV playing together with Ruud Gullit, Frank Arnesen, Huub Stevens and Willy van de Kerkhof followed by Brazilian star Romário. In 1986, Gerets won the title with PSV, and after the departure of Gullit in 1987, Gerets became the new captain. Under Guus Hiddink PSV won the league and cup double three years in a row, Gerets scoring twice in the cup final against Roda JC. In 1988 PSV reached the UEFA European Cup final facing Benfica. After 120 minutes, it was still 0–0; PSV eventually won on penalties.

In 1990, Bobby Robson was appointed as Hiddink's successor. Under Robson, Gerets won another two titles with PSV then he retired at the end of the 1991–1992 season at the age of 37.

International career
Gerets registered 86 caps for the Belgium national team. He made his debut for the squad in 1975, and played at four major tournaments: the 1980 European Championship, 1982 World Cup, 1986 World Cup, and 1990 World Cup.

In 1980, Gerets played in his first European Championship in Italy. He scored the opening goal in a 2–1 win against Spain which ensured Belgium qualified as group winners. The tournament is remembered for the inspired performance of the offensively-minded Belgium (around rising stars such as Jan Ceulemans, Eric Gerets, Jean-Marie Pfaff and Erwin Vandenbergh) who unexpectedly reached the final, only losing to West Germany (1–2) by a Hrubesch goal two minutes from time.

At the 1982 World Cup, Belgium, captained by Gerets, recorded one of their most famous victories with a 1–0 win over defending champions Argentina in the first game of the tournament held at Camp Nou with a goal by Erwin Vandenbergh, and an excellent defensive display to hold off a young Diego Maradona.

Four years later, they achieved their best World Cup run at that time in 1986 when they placed fourth under command of players like Jan Ceulemans, Jean-Marie Pfaff and captain Gerets. Belgium surprisingly won against favourites the Soviet Union with stars such as Igor Belanov and Rinat Dasayev (3–4) after extra time. Belgium also beat Spain on penalties, but they lost to eventual champions Argentina in the semi-final (0–2), inspired by Maradona. Despite their defeat, Belgium would end up in fourth place – their best finish in World Cup competition until it was surpassed in 2018 when they reached third place.

Gerets would also captain his nation to the 1990 World Cup finals. Belgium failed to convert their chances against England in the second round. They lost in the last minute of extra time after a goal by David Platt.

International goals
Scores and results list Belgium's goal tally first.

Managerial career

As a manager, Gerets worked successively for FC Liège, Lierse, Club Brugge, PSV, 1. FC Kaiserslautern and VfL Wolfsburg before joining Galatasaray at the end of the 2004–05 season. In the 1996–97 season, he won the Belgian championships with Lierse, reprising the feat in the season 1998–99 with Club Brugge. He also won the Dutch championships twice (1999–2000 and 2000–01) with PSV. In the 2005–06 season, Gerets won the Turkish Premier Super League with Galatasaray. In May 2007, he left the club, and on 25 September became Marseille's coach.

In his first year with Marseille in 2007, he managed to get the team from the bottom of the league up to finish their 2007–08 season in third place. On 29 April 2009, he confirmed that he would not be in charge of Marseille after the summer when his contract expired. On 26 May 2009, he signed a contract to take over as head coach of Saudi club Al-Hilal for two years for an annual fee of €1.8 million. On 6 July 2010, he signed a four-year contract with Morocco. He would do the job part-time until he completed the Asian Champions League campaign with Al Hilal but stranded in the semi-finals. He was in charge of Morocco for almost two years. He was sacked on 15 September 2012 after a Morocco's 2–0 defeat against Mozambique in the first-leg of the 2013 Africa Cup of Nations qualification.

Less than a month after leaving Morocco, he accepted a contract offer to become the head coach of Qatari defending champions Lekhwiya on 9 October 2012.
In the 2013-14 season, he brought another Qatari championship title to Lekhwiya.

Gerets departed Lekhwiya and became the head coach of the United Arab Emirates team Al Jazira Club on 20 May 2014.

Managerial statistics

Honours

Club

Standard Liège

 Belgian First Division: 1981–82, 1982–83
 Belgian Cup: 1980–81
 Belgian Super Cup: 1981
 Belgian League Cup: 1975
 European Cup Winners' Cup: 1981-82 (runners-up)
Intertoto Cup Group Winners: 1980, 1982

PSV 

 Eredivisie: 1985–86, 1986–87, 1987–88, 1988–89, 1990–91, 1991–92
 KNVB Cup: 1987–88, 1988–89 1989–90
 European Cup: 1987–88 (winners)

International

Belgium

 UEFA European Championship: 1980 (runners-up)
 FIFA World Cup: 1986 (fourth place)
 Belgian Sports Merit Award: 1980

Individual 

 Belgian Golden Shoe: 1982
 Bronze Shoe: 1981
 Ballon d'Or nominations: 1982, 1983
 Don Balón World Cup All-Star team: 1982
 France Football + La Gazzetta dello Sport World Cup All-Star team: 1986
 Belgian Golden Shoe of the 20th Century 8th place: 1995
 Platina 11 (Best Team in 50 Years Golden Shoe Winners): 2003
 The Best Golden Shoe Team Ever: 2011
 RBFA 125 Years Icons Team: 2020
 AD The Best PSV Team Ever: 2020
 IFFHS All Time Belgium Dream Team: 2021

Manager

Lierse SK

 Belgian First Division: 1996–97

Club Brugge

 Belgian First Division: 1997–98
 Belgian Super Cup: 1998

PSV

 Eredivisie: 1999–2000, 2000–01
 Johan Cruyff Shield: 2000, 2001

Galatasaray

 Süper Lig: 2005–06

Al Hilal SFC 

 Saudi Professional League: 2009–10
 Saudi Crown Prince Cup: 2010

Morocco 

 Arab Nations Cup: 2012

Lekhwiya

 Qatar Stars League: 2013–14
 Crown Prince Cup: 2013

Individual 

 Belgian Professional Manager of the Year: 1996–97, 1997–98
 Ligue 1 Manager of the Year: 2008–09
 Raymond Goethals award: 2011

References

External links

 
 
 
 CV Eric Gerets

1954 births
Living people
People from Lanaken
Footballers from Limburg (Belgium)
Belgian footballers
Association football defenders
Standard Liège players
A.C. Milan players
MVV Maastricht players
PSV Eindhoven players
Belgian Pro League players
Serie A players
Eredivisie players
Belgium international footballers
UEFA Euro 1980 players
1982 FIFA World Cup players
1986 FIFA World Cup players
1990 FIFA World Cup players
Belgian expatriate footballers
Belgian expatriate sportspeople in Italy
Belgian expatriate sportspeople in the Netherlands
Expatriate footballers in Italy
Expatriate footballers in the Netherlands
Belgian football managers
RFC Liège managers
Lierse S.K. managers
Club Brugge KV head coaches
PSV Eindhoven managers
1. FC Kaiserslautern managers
VfL Wolfsburg managers
Galatasaray S.K. (football) managers
Olympique de Marseille managers
Al Hilal SFC managers
Morocco national football team managers
Lekhwiya SC managers
Al Jazira Club managers
Belgian Pro League managers
Eredivisie managers
Bundesliga managers
Süper Lig managers
Ligue 1 managers
Saudi Professional League managers
Qatar Stars League
UAE Pro League managers
2012 Africa Cup of Nations managers
Belgian expatriate football managers
Belgian expatriate sportspeople in Germany
Belgian expatriate sportspeople in Turkey
Belgian expatriate sportspeople in France
Belgian expatriate sportspeople in Saudi Arabia
Belgian expatriate sportspeople in Morocco
Belgian expatriate sportspeople in Qatar
Belgian expatriate sportspeople in the United Arab Emirates
Expatriate football managers in the Netherlands
Expatriate football managers in Germany
Expatriate football managers in Turkey
Expatriate football managers in France
Expatriate football managers in Saudi Arabia
Expatriate football managers in Morocco
Expatriate football managers in Qatar
Expatriate football managers in the United Arab Emirates